Binnamangala is one of the early settlements in Bengaluru. It is part of C. V. Raman Nagar Assembly constituency in East Bengaluru. This former village was  merged with Bangalore Mahanagara Palike in the 1981 census.

Location

References

Neighbourhoods in Bangalore